Subha Sankalpam is a 1995 Indian Telugu-language film directed by K. Viswanath and produced by noted singer, S. P. Balasubrahmanyam. It stars Kamal Haasan, Aamani and Priya Raman, with Viswanath also playing a pivotal role. P. C. Sreeram handled the camera while M. M. Keeravani composed the music for the film. The film won five Nandi Awards and three Filmfare Awards. The film was later dubbed into Tamil-language as Paasavalai.

Cast 
Kamal Haasan as  Dasu
Aamani as  Ganga
K. Viswanath as  Raayudu
Priya Raman as  Sandhya
Kota Srinivasa Rao
Marutirao Gollapudi as  Chennakesava Rao
Nirmalamma
Rallapalli as  Bheema Raju
Sakshi Ranga Rao
Sameer
Mallikharjunarao
Sanjay Asrani
Srilakshmi
Vaishnavi

Production 
Kamal Haasan, co-producer for the film, persuaded and succeeded in getting K. Viswanath to make his debut as an actor for the film. Kamal Haasan revealed that the character required a renowned person to play the man who he bowed to, and if it was any other person, scenes would have had to be used to establish his importance. This film was produced by acclaimed singer S. P. Balasubrahmanyam.

Awards 
Nandi Awards 
  
 Best Actress - Aamani
 Best Supporting Actress - Vaishnavi  
 Best Character Actor - K. Viswanath
 Best Female Playback Singer - S. P. Sailaja 
 Best Editor - G.G.Krishna Rao

Filmfare Awards South 
 
 Best Film - Telugu - S. P. Balasubrahmanyam
 Best Director - Telugu - K. Viswanath
 Best Music Director - Telugu - M. M. Keeravani

Release and reception 
The Movie released on April 28, 1995. The film won five Nandi Awards.

The film was later dubbed into Tamil-language as Paasavalai, released on July 28, 1995. Tamil dubbed version was distributed by Kamal Haasan's own production company Raaj Kamal Films International. Reviewing the Tamil dubbed version Paasavalai for Tamil magazine Kalki, R. P. R. wrote it is possible only for the best directors to bring a unique actor to his style and make him show a new dimension. K. Viswanath has achieved. In that sense it is not a Kamal film; Vishwanath film.

Soundtrack 

The music for this movie was composed by M. M. Keeravani. This album involved the voices of S. P. Balasubrahmanyam,  K. S. Chithra, S. P. Sailaja and Pallavi. All tracks were huge hits, especially the song "Seetamma Andalu" (by S. P. Balasubrahmanyam, Chithra & Sailaja), it was expressively sung by Sailaja, which fetched her first Nandi Award. Lyrics were written by Veturi and Sitarama Sastry. Even Keeravani won a Filmfare Award for best music direction. Keeravani used Chithra's voice for the character Sandhya in the picture, and Sailaja's voice for Amani (which needed a folky touch) and Pallavi's voice was used to provide a Hollywood tinge of background music. The song "Narudu Bratuku Nartana" sung by S. P. Balasubrahmanyam involved the hit track of Ilaiyaraaja's musical Sagara Sangamam and that track involved  2 tracks of this picture itself (Chiranjeevi Soubhagyavathi-Seethamma Andalu).
Telugu tracklist

Tamil tracklist
Seethaiyamma - SPB, Chithra, SP Sailaja
Poomaalai - SPB, SP Sailaja
Sree Rangathu - SPB
Indha Kadudhasikku - SPB, Chithra, SP Sailaja
Kadu Malaigal - SPB, SP Sailaja
Ulaga Vaazhkai - SPB, SP Sailaja
Sree Hariyin Paadham - SPB, SP Sailaja, Chithra

References

External links 
 

1995 films
Films scored by M. M. Keeravani
Films directed by K. Viswanath
Indian romantic drama films
Films shot in Andhra Pradesh
Films about fishing
1990s Telugu-language films
1995 romantic drama films